The Furnese baronetcy, of Waldershare in the County of Kent, was a title in the Baronetage of Great Britain. It was created on 27 June 1707 for Henry Furnese, a financier and member of parliament for Bramber and Sandwich. The second Baronet was member of parliament for Truro, New Romney and Kent. The title became extinct on the early death of the third Baronet in March 1735.

Furnese baronets, of Waldershare (1707)

Sir Henry Furnese, 1st Baronet ( – 1712)
Sir Robert Furnese, 2nd Baronet (1687–1733)
Sir Henry Furnese, 3rd Baronet (c. 1716 – 1735)

References

Extinct baronetcies in the Baronetage of Great Britain